WorldNet Telecommunications is a competitive local exchange carrier that provides broadband Internet access and telephone services in Puerto Rico. The company is headquartered in Guaynabo.

External links
 WorldNet Telecommunications Official Site

Internet service providers of Puerto Rico